The scaly-breasted bulbul (Ixodia squamata) is a species of songbird in the bulbul family.
It is found from the Malay Peninsula to Borneo.
Its natural habitat is subtropical or tropical moist lowland forests.
It is threatened by habitat loss.

Taxonomy and systematics
The scaly-breasted bulbul was originally described in the genus Ixos and later moved to Pycnonotus. Pycnonotus was found to be polyphyletic  in recent molecular phylogenetic studies and three bulbul species, including the scaly-breasted bulbul, moved to Ixodia.  Some authorities use Ixidia for the genus name because Ixodia was thought to be  preoccupied.

Subspecies

Three subspecies are recognized:

 I. s. webberi - (Hume, 1879): originally described as a separate species. Found on the Malay Peninsula and Sumatra
 I. s. squamatus - (Temminck, 1828): found on Java
 I. s. borneensis - Chasen, 1941: found on Borneo

References

scaly-breasted bulbul
Birds of the Malay Peninsula
Birds of Malesia
scaly-breasted bulbul
Taxonomy articles created by Polbot
Taxobox binomials not recognized by IUCN